Air Pacific was a commuter airline based in the United States that operated regional flights wholly within the state of California. Founded as Eureka Aero in 1970, it was renamed Air Pacific in 1979. Its de Havilland Canada DHC-6 Twin Otter and DHC-7 Dash 7 turboprop aircraft were capable of STOL (short takeoff and landing) operations.

Air Pacific merged with Gem State Airlines in 1980 to form Golden Gate Airlines, which merged again in 1981 with Swift Aire Lines, but service was discontinued shortly thereafter.

Destinations
Air Pacific served the following destinations in California during its existence, with some of these destinations being served at different times:

Bakersfield, California (BFL)
Chico, California (CIC)
Los Angeles, California (LAX)
Merced, California (MCE)
Modesto, California (MOD)
Oakland, California (OAK)
Redding, California (RDD)
Sacramento, California (SMF)
San Francisco, California (SFO)
Santa Rosa, California (STS)
South Lake Tahoe, California (TVL)
Stockton, California (SCK)

Historical fleet
de Havilland Canada DHC-6 Twin Otter
de Havilland Canada DHC-7 Dash 7

See also
 List of defunct airlines of the United States

References

Defunct airlines of the United States
Airlines established in 1970
Airlines disestablished in 1981
Airlines based in California